André Hornez (12 May 1905 – 9 March 1989) was a French lyricist and screenwriter.

Lyricist of Paul Misraki in the years 1930-1940 for which he writes many songs lyrics like Qu'est-ce qu'on attend pour être heureux? (1937), André Hornez then became the lyricist of Henri Betti in the years 1940-1950 for which he wrote the lyrics to C'est si bon (1947) and Rien dans les mains, rien dans les poches which were sung by Yves Montand.

Biography 
Born in Lens in 1905, André Hornez a passion early for architecture and writing. He finally chose writing. He began his career as secretary of Saint-Granier. For him, he writes books magazines and operettas. The author is also hired by Paramount company in Hollywood to write screenplays.

His first songs are composed by Paul Misraki and performed by Ray Ventura and Maurice Chevalier. As for Ray Ventura, they collaborate with lyricist for many years. Among the best-known songs from this collaboration are Ça Vaut Mieux que d'Attraper la Scarlatine (1936), Qu'est-ce qu'on Attend pour être Heureux? (1937), Comme tout le Monde (1938), Tiens, tiens, tiens ! (1939), Dans mon Cœur (1940), Maria de Bahia (1946) and La mi-août (1950).

In 1936, the song Tant qu'il y aura des Étoiles, performed by Tino Rossi, became a classic of French song. In the late 1930s, André Hornez also wrote for Rina Ketty (Sérénade sans Espoir, 1939) and Johnny Hess (Je suis Swing, 1939).

Screenwriter for film, he wrote a number of film lyrics like Avec son Tralala sung by Suzy Delair in Quai des Orfèvres (1947) by Henri-Georges Clouzot. His songs are performed by Yves Montand (Moi j'm'en Fous, Du Soleil plein la Tête), Lucienne Delyle (Mon Cœur Attendait, 1951), André Claveau (Malgré Tout, 1951) or Line Renaud (Ni Pourquoi ni Comment).

In 1947, he collaborated for the first time with the composer Henri Betti for to write the lyrics of C'est si bon. This song became an international jazz standard from the 1950s.

A large majority of the author's songs were written for the cinema or for operettas. Several of his songs have become immortal French song.

André Hornez died in Le Perreux-sur-Marne in 1989 and is buried with his wife in the cemetery of Faverolles.

Personal life 
On 5 July 1963, in Boulogne-Billancourt, André Hornez married the dancer Gisèle Fréry (1929-2013), whom he met on the operetta Baratin in 1949. His best man was Bruno Coquatrix. The couple had no children.

Respects 
 On 18 December 2003 a street in Lens, where he was born in 1905, was named after him.
 On 12 May 2007 a commemorative plaque bearing his name was placed on the facade of the building where he was born.

Filmography

Screenwriter 
 1936 : Les Deux Favoris
 1937 : Le Chanteur de minuit
 1938 : 
 1939 : Tourbillon de Paris
 1943 : Feux de joie
 1947 : En êtes-vous bien sûr?
 1950 : Nous irons à Paris
 1950 : La Petite Chocolatière
 1950 : Le Roi Pandore
 1950 : Pigalle-Saint-Germain-des-Prés
 1951 : Les Joyeux Pélerins
 1951 : Jamais deux sans trois
 1952 : Mon curé chez les riches
 1953 : The Sparrows of Paris
 1956 : Baratin

Lyricist 
 1933 : Monsieur Bébé
 1934 : La Prison de Saint-Clothaire
 1935 : Folies-Bergère de Paris
 1938 : Belle Étoile
 1938 : Retour à l'aube
 1947 : Quai des Orfèvres
 1950 : Pigalle-Saint-Germain-des-Prés
 1951 : Nous irons à Monte Carlo
 1952 : Une fille sur la route
 1953 : L'Œil en coulisses
 1954 : Le Fil à la patte
 1956 : The Road to Paradise
 1956 : Et Dieu… créa la femme

Director 
 1936 : Les Deux Favoris, with Georg Jacoby

Operettas 

 1929 : Jim by Georges Ghestem, Opéra de Lille
 1930 : Loulli by Georges Ghestem, Opéra de Lille
 1936 : Normandie by Paul Misraki, Théâtre des Bouffes-Parisiens
 1936 : Simone est comme ça by Raoul Moretti, Théâtre des Bouffes-Parisiens
 1938 : La Féerie blanche by Casimir Oberfeld et Mitty Goldin, Théâtre Mogador
 1948 : Le Chevalier Bayard by Bruno Coquatrix, Théâtre de l'Alhambra
 1949 : Baratin by Henri Betti, L'Européen
 1950 : M'sieur Nanar by Jean-Jacques Vital, Théâtre de l'Étoile
 1953 : Mobilette by Henri Betti, L’Européen
 1960 : La Petite Datcha by Georges Soria, Théâtre Gramont

References

External links 
 
 
 André Hornez at the AlloCiné
 André Hornez at the BnF
 André Hornez at the Discogs
 André Hornez at the Unifrance
 André Hornez at the Hall de la chanson
 André Hornez on Ciné-Ressources
 André Hornez at the Les Archives du spectacle
 André Hornez at the Les Auteurs et Compositeurs de la Chanson Francophone
 André Hornez at the Les Gens du cinéma
 André Hornez at the Encyclopédie de la comédie musicale
 André Hornez at the Notre Cinéma
 André Hornez at the Geneastar

1905 births
1989 deaths
Lyricists
20th-century French screenwriters